Coventry City Council is the local government body responsible for the governance of the City of Coventry in England, which has been a metropolitan district since 1974.

The city is divided up into 18 Wards each with three councillors. Coventry has usually been controlled by the Labour Party over the past few decades, and at times they appeared to be in safe control. However, the Conservatives held control for a short time in the 1970s, and they also held control from July 2004 until 2010. For a time they held control on the casting vote of the Lord Mayor, but they won clear control at the local elections of 4 May 2006. However, in 2010 the Conservatives lost control of Coventry City Council when Labour gained enough seats to have overall control.

The leader of the controlling Labour group is George Duggins. He has held the post of Leader of the Council since May 2016 after winning a leadership election against the incumbent Ann Lucas. The Chief Executive is Martin Reeves. The leader of the Conservative group is Gary Ridley who has held the post since May 2017 after John Blundell, stood down. 

In 2017 the council will move the majority of its staff to the Friargate development. It will be the first tenant in the new business district, located next to Coventry railway station.

Council affiliation

History 

Coventry's first female mayor, appointed in 1937, was Alice Arnold.

See also 

 Coventry City Council elections

References

External links 
 Official website
 
 Catalogue of the Coventry Borough Labour Party archives, held at the Modern Records Centre, University of Warwick

Metropolitan district councils of England
Local government in Coventry
Local education authorities in England
Local authorities in the West Midlands (county)
Billing authorities in England
Leader and cabinet executives
1974 establishments in England